The kingdom of East Anglia (also known as the kingdom of the East Angles), was a small independent Anglo-Saxon kingdom that comprised what are now the English counties of Norfolk and Suffolk and perhaps the eastern part of the Fens. The kingdom was one of the seven traditional members of the Anglo-Saxon Heptarchy. The East Angles were initially ruled (from the 6th century until 749) by members of the Wuffingas dynasty, named after Wuffa, whose name means 'descendants of the wolf'. The last king was Guthrum II, who ruled in the 10th century.

After 749 East Anglia was ruled by kings whose genealogy is not known, or by sub-kings who were under the control of the kings of Mercia. East Anglia briefly recovered its independence after the death of Offa of Mercia in 796, but Mercian hegemony was soon restored by his successor, Coenwulf. Between 826 and 869, following an East Anglian revolt in which the Mercian king, Beornwulf, was killed, the East Angles again regained their independence. In 869 a Danish army defeated and killed the last native East Anglian king, Edmund the Martyr. The kingdom then fell into the hands of the Danes and eventually formed part of the Danelaw. In 918 the East Anglian Danes accepted the overlordship of Edward the Elder of Wessex. East Anglia then became part of the Anglo-Saxon kingdom of England.

Many of the regnal dates of the East Anglian kings are considered unreliable, often being based upon computations. Some dates have presented particular problems for scholars: for instance, during the three-year-long period of apostasy that followed the murder of Eorpwald, when it is not known whether any king ruled the East Angles. The main source of information about the early history of the kingdom's rulers is Bede's Ecclesiastical History of the English People.

Chronological list

See also

Footnotes

Sources

Further reading 

East Anglia
Kingdom of East Anglia